Orotava hamula is a species of tephritid or fruit flies in the genus Orotava of the family Tephritidae.

Distribution
Japan, Indonesia.

References

Tephritinae
Insects described in 1914
Diptera of Asia